The Rifle Falls Fish Hatchery is a Colorado Parks and Wildlife cold water fish production facility located off East Rifle Creek near Rifle Falls State Park in Garfield County.

History
Rifle Falls Fish Hatchery was inaugurated in 1955. It is the largest state-owned and operated trout production hatchery in Colorado. Water was irrigated directly from Rifle Creek and utilized 24 nursing ponds and 25 raceways. Currently, only 12 of 24 nursing ponds are used as to prevent spread of disease to Rifle Creek waters.

Mission
An overarching mission among the hatchery staff is species restoration of the cutthroat trout to Colorado's western waters. Division of Wildlife biologists inform the hatchery director of where and when to stock the trout as to ensure restoration. They discover locations that require stocking from the Creel Census.

Fish species
Hatchery staff works to produce fingerlings and catchables of rainbow trout, Snake River cutthroat trout, brook trout, brown trout, and cutthroat trout. They stock these species in stream sections, lakes, and reservoirs in western Colorado and provides catchable trout for stocking along the Front Range. Cutthroat trout are also raised for aerial stocking. Their source of water comes from a groundwater spring. The use of spring water maintains a constant temperature of 59 degrees Fahrenheit. Trout are raised in 40 raceways and transported by tanker truck to their stocking destination. They are released through a valve in the base of the tank. Stocking may be done manually in limited access areas. Stocking tends to occur between February - November.

References 

Fish hatcheries in the United States
Buildings and structures in Garfield County, Colorado
Tourist attractions in Colorado